Atlético Coruña Montañeros Club de Fútbol, known simply as Montañeros, formerly Montañeros Club de Fútbol Banco Gallego, is a Spanish football team based in A Coruña, in the autonomous community of Galicia. Founded in 1968, it plays in Regional Preferente, and holds home matches at Complexo Deportivo de Elviña Grande, with a capacity of 1,500 spectators.

History

Founded in 1968 as Asociación Juvenil Montañeros del Sagrado Corazón, Montañeros only created a football club ten years later, eventually changing name to Club Montañeros del Sagrado Corazón, only taking part of youth competitions. In 1994, as the club was close to bankruptcy, president Fausto Vázquez took over and improved the club's youth setup, changing its name to Montañeros CF.

In 2003, after the success of the Juvenil squad, Montañeros started his senior club with the support of Banco Gallego, changing name again to Montañeros CF Banco Gallego. It first reached Tercera División in 2007, and promoted to Segunda División B in 2009.

On 1 June 2012, after the club's relegation to the fourth division, Montañeros dissolved its senior squad, only working with the youth categories. In 2014, the club was absorbed by Sporting Universidad da Coruña CF (a club founded in 2004), becoming Atlético Coruña CF and changing name to Atlético Coruña Montañeros CF two years later.

Background
Asociación Juvenil Montañeros del Sagrado Corazón - (1968–78)
Club Montañeros del Sagrado Corazón - (1978–94)
Montañeros CF - (1994–2003)
Montañeros CF Banco Gallego - (2003–12)
Atlético Coruña CF - (2014–16)
Atlético Coruña Montañeros CF - (2016–)

Season to season
As Montañeros CF Banco Gallego

3 seasons in Segunda División B
2 seasons in Tercera División

As Sporting Universidad da Coruña CF

As Atlético Coruña CF

As Atlético Coruña Montañeros CF

Famous players
   Yago
 Rubén Rivera
 Nico (youth)

External links
Official website 
Futbolme team profile 

Football clubs in Galicia (Spain)
Association football clubs established in 1968
1968 establishments in Spain